Blakeley may refer to:

People
Blakeley (surname)

Places in the United States

Areas and settlements
 Blakeley, Alabama, a ghost town
 Blakeley Township, Scott County, Minnesota
 Blakeley, New York, an unincorporated hamlet
 Blakeley, Oregon, an unincorporated historic locale
 Blakeley, Pennsylvania, a town in Lackawanna County, Pennsylvania
 Blakeley, West Virginia, an unincorporated community

Buildings
 Blakeley Building, Lawrence, Massachusetts, on the National Register of Historic Places
 Blakeley (West Virginia), an historic house near Charles Town, West Virginia

Landforms
 Blakeley River, Alabama
 Blakeley Island (Alabama)
 Blakeley Island, Washington

Other uses
 USS Blakeley (DD-150), a destroyer during World War II
 Blakely v. Washington, a 2004 United States Supreme Court decision

See also
 Blakeley Raise, a fell in the English Lake District
 Blakely (disambiguation)
 Blakeney (disambiguation)